Atti is a 2016  Indian Tamil comedy film directed by Vijayabhaskar, starring Ma Ka Pa Anand and Ashmitha in the lead roles. Featuring music composed by Sundar C Babu, who also distributes the venture, the film began production in mid 2014.

Cast
Ma Ka Pa Anand as Bava
Ashmitha
Ramki as Omprakash
Rajendran
Yogi Babu
Aruldoss as Radha
Ramachandran Durairaj as Mookuthi
Mahanadhi Shankar as a police officer
Azhagu
Mippu
Thangadurai
Muthukumar as Munnusamy

Production
Ma Ka Pa Anand signed the film during July 2014 before the release of his first acting venture, and began preparing for the role by observing how gaana singers in Chennai operate.  Pazhaya Vannarapettai Ashmita was cast as the heroine. Actors Ramki, Rajendran and Yogi Babu also worked on the film during a schedule in late 2014.

The film went through a production delay during 2015, before promotions for the film's release began in July 2016. The film was withdrawn on the morning of 7 July 2016 after problems with financiers, before it released in December 2016.

Soundtrack
The soundtrack was composed by Sundar C Babu.

Reception 
Malini Mannath of The New Indian Express wrote that "it’s too long an affair".

References

External links 
 

2016 films
Indian comedy films
2010s Tamil-language films
Films scored by Sundar C. Babu
2016 comedy films